Recep İvedik 2 It is a 2009 Turkish comedy film that is a sequel to Recep İvedik. The film, starring Şahan Gökbakar, was directed by Şahan Gökbakar's brother, Togan Gökbakar.

Storyline
A lonely man; who has not adapted to social norms, has not developed his social skills, and therefore has never tasted love or being loved but is used to this situation; tried to get some respect from society because of his sick grandmum's wishes.

Cast
 Şahan Gökbakar as Recep Ivedik
 Gülsen Özbakan as Nene Ivedik
 Efe Babacan as Hakan Ivedik
 Çagri Büyüksayar as Ali Kerem

Sequels

External links
 
 
 
 

2009 films
2009 comedy films
Films set in Istanbul
Films set in Turkey
Turkish sequel films
Turkish comedy films
2000s Turkish-language films
Films directed by Togan Gökbakar